This is a list of the complete squads for the 2020 Six Nations Championship, an annual rugby union tournament contested by the national rugby teams of England, France, Ireland, Italy, Scotland and Wales. Wales are the defending champions.

Note: Number of caps and players' ages are indicated as of 1 February 2020 – the tournament's opening day. For players added to a squad during the tournament, their caps and age are indicated as of the date of their call-up.

England
On 20 January, Eddie Jones named a 36-man squad for the 2020 Six Nations Championship. In February 2020 it was announced that Beno Obano and Henry Slade had joined the squad with Mako Vunipola withdrawing for family reasons.

Head coach:  Eddie Jones

France
On 8 January, Galthié named a 42-man squad for the 2020 Six Nations Championship.

Head coach:  Fabien Galthié

Call-ups
On 13 January, Peato Mauvaka was called up to replace the injured Anthony Étrillard.

On 19 January, Wilfrid Hounkpatin was called up to replace the injured Dorian Aldegheri.

On 26 January, Alexandre Roumat and Yvan Reilhac were called up to replace the injured Dylan Cretin and Kylan Hamdaoui.

On 27 January, Teddy Baubigny was called up to replace the injured Camille Chat.

On 17 February: Guillaume Ducat, Maxime Lucu, Baptiste Delaporte, Alivereti Raka & Lucas Tauzin were called up to replace the injured Cyril Cazeaux, Baptiste Couilloud, Sekou Makalou, Julien Hériteau & Lester Etien.

Ireland
On 15 January 2020, Andy Farrell named his 35-man Ireland squad for the 2020 Six Nations Championship.

Head coach:  Andy Farrell

Call-ups
On 20 January, Stuart McCloskey was added to the squad due to a number of backs sustaining minor knocks.

On 3 February, Will Connors was added to the squad.

Italy
On 19 January 2020, Italy named their 36-man squad for the 2020 Six Nations Championship. 
On 20 January 2020, Giovanni Pettinelli replaces David Sisi.

Head coach:  Franco Smith (interim)

Scotland
On 15 January 2020, Townsend named a 38-man squad.

Head coach:  Gregor Townsend

Call-ups

On 24 January Duncan Weir was called up to join the squad.

On 16 February Sam Skinner and Matt Fagerson were added to the squad, with Alex Craig being released back to his club.

On 1 March Lewis Carmichael was added to the squad, with Cornell du Preez being released back to his club.

Wales

On 15 January 2020, Pivac announced a 38-man squad.

Head coach:  Wayne Pivac

References

squads
2020 Squads